Bas Edo Kuipers (born 17 August 1994) is a Dutch professional footballer who plays as a left back for Eredivisie club Go Ahead Eagles.

Club career

Ajax
Born in Amsterdam, Kuipers was recruited into the youth academy of AFC Ajax in 2001 after having been discovered during the club's annual Talentendagen (Talent days) where young kids can come play football at Ajax for a chance to join the club's acclaimed youth academy. He joined the F1 Pupils selection at first from where he has advanced through every possible stage of the club's youth system. On 15 March 2013, Kuipers signed his first professional contract with Ajax, signing a 2-year deal binding him to the club until 30 June 2015. Kuipers participated in the club's training camp during the pre-season, where he appeared in two friendly matches for the first team, namely against RKC Waalwijk on 13 July 2013, coming on in the 63' minute in the 1–5 victory at the Mandemakers Stadion, while also making an appearance in the pre-season friendly match in the 63' minute against De Graafschap which ended in a 0–3 victory on the same day.

The start of the 2013–14 season saw Kuipers beginning with the reserves team Jong Ajax who had recently been promoted to the Dutch Eerste Divisie, the 2nd tier of professional football in the Netherlands, having previously played in the Beloften Eredivisie. On 30 August 2013 Kuipers made his professional debut for the reserves team in a home match against Jong Twente. The match ended in a 2–1 victory for the Amsterdammers. On 8 September 2013, Kuipers wore the captain's arm band for the first time for Jong Ajax in the away match against Achilles '29, which ended in a 2–1 loss.

Excelsior
on 4 August 2014 it was announced that Kuipers would join Excelsior from Rotterdam on a one-year loan deal. He made his first appearance for Excelsior on 2 November 2014 in a 3–3 draw against AZ in Alkmaar. Following a successful season with Excelsior where he made 30 regular season appearances, Kuipers then made a permanent transfer in the Summer of 2015, signing a 2-year contract.

NEC
After a short spell in Romania with Viitorul Constanța in 2019, where he won the Romanian Cup and Romanian Super Cup, appearing in both matches, Kuipers returned to Holland in August 2019 signing for NEC in the Eerste Divisie on an initial trial. After a successful trial, Kuipers signed a one-year contract with NEC with the option for a further year. He played as a starter on left back during the 2019–20 season, but did not receive a contract extension and left the club as a free agent.

Go Ahead Eagles
On 6 July 2020, Kuipers signed a two-year contract with Go Ahead Eagles. He scored the crucial goal as Go Ahead Eagles defeated Excelsior 1–0 to secure promotion to the Eredivisie on 12 May 2021.

International career
Kuipers made his debut for the Dutch national team playing for the under-16 selection in their 2009 appearance in the 11th Tournoi Val de Marne in Paris, France. His first appearance was on 29 October 2009 in a 1–2 loss against Spain U-16. Two days later he appeared in the 0–2 victory over Italy U-16 however failing to help his side secure advancement to the next round of the tournament. Two months later he appeared in the Nike International friendlies tournament '09 in Phoenix, Arizona playing in two fixtures, namely against Portugal U-16 on 5 December 2012, which ended in a 2–1 win, and against the United States U-16 which resulted in a 0–3 victory for the Dutch. His final two appearances for the under-16 squad were at the Albufeira 4 nations tournament in Portugal where his side would face Italy U-16 and Ireland U-16 losing the first match 1–3, while securing the 3–1 win in the following fixture. He received his first call up for the Netherlands U-17 appearing in a friendly match against Germany U-17 on 15 September 2010 in game which ended in a 2–1 loss for the Netherlands.

Personal life
Kuipers is the nephew of the famous Dutch astronaut André Kuipers.

Career statistics

Club

Honours
Viitorul Constanța
 Cupa României: 2018–19
 Supercupa României: 2019

References

External links
 
 Netherlands stats at OnsOranje

1994 births
Living people
Dutch footballers
Footballers from Amsterdam
Netherlands youth international footballers
Netherlands under-21 international footballers
Association football defenders
AFC Ajax players
Eerste Divisie players
Jong Ajax players
Eredivisie players
Excelsior Rotterdam players
ADO Den Haag players
Go Ahead Eagles players
Liga I players
FC Viitorul Constanța players
Dutch expatriate footballers
Dutch expatriate sportspeople in Romania
Expatriate footballers in Romania